Diamond Crown is a super premium brand of handmade cigar handmade by Tabacalera A. Fuente in the Dominican Republic for the J.C. Newman Cigar Company.

J.C. Newman originally made this cigar with Cuban tobacco in Cleveland, Ohio and then Tampa, Florida in the 1940s, 1950s and 1960s.

In 1995, the Diamond Crown brand was re-launched by the Newman family to commemorate their family company's 100th anniversary and century of cigar making. Cigar Aficionado Magazine rated the cigars highly.

Ratings

Cigar Aficionado Magazine has awarded Diamond Crown cigars with ratings of 92, 91, 90, 90, 90.

Top25Cigars.com lists Diamond Crown cigars as two of the top twenty cigars in the world.

Tobacco

 Wrapper: Exclusive Connecticut Fermented Wrapper (CFW)
 Binder: Dominican
 Filler: Dominican

Source: Cigar Cyclopedia

References

External links
 Official Website

Cigar brands